Bear River is a small clear slow-moving river in the U.S. state of Michigan.  long, it is the largest tributary of Little Traverse Bay in the northwest of the lower peninsula.  Traverse Bay is on Lake Michigan. The river is formed as the outflow of Walloon Lake on the boundary between Charlevoix County and Emmet County, draining from the southeast end of the lake at  near the community of Walloon Lake in Melrose Township. M-75 has its northern terminus in a junction with US 131 nearby.

Petoskey was at first known as "Bear River" until being renamed in 1873. The Bear River itself has also been known as "Bear Creek" and "Ellis Creek".

The river has excellent fishing and provides opportunities for peaceful canoeing or kayaking. The river is great for smelt fishing. For most of its path in Emmet County, River Road and the Tuscola and Saginaw Bay Railway parallel the river on its west banks.

Tributaries 
 (left) Spring Brook
 (right) South Branch Spring Brook
 (right) Gimlet Creek
 (left) North Branch Spring Brook
 (right) Hay Marsh Creek
 Walloon Lake
 Schoofs Creek

Drainage basin 
Including Walloon Lake, the Bear River system drains all or portions of the following cities and townships:
 Charlevoix County
 Bay Township
 Boyne Valley Township
 Chandler Township
 Evangeline Township
 Hudson Township
 Melrose Township
 Emmet County
 Bear Creek Township
 Petoskey
 Resort Township
 Springvale Township

References

External links 
 Bear River on Fishweb

Rivers of Charlevoix County, Michigan
Rivers of Emmet County, Michigan
Rivers of Michigan
Tributaries of Lake Michigan